Tiago Silva dos Santos (born 4 April 1979 in Taquari, Rio Grande do Sul) is a former footballer who played as a defender. Born in Brazil, he represented the Bulgaria national team once in a friendly.

Club career
Tiago Silva joined CSKA Sofia from PFC Litex Lovech in 2005. He has also previously played for Palmeiras, with whom he has won the Copa Mercosur and Copa Libertadores trophies.

He signed a three-year contract with Belgian First Division Club Racing Genk on 18 July 2007.

International career
Tiago Silva made one appearance with the Bulgaria national football team in a 3–1 friendly win against Turkey on 17 August 2005.

However, Tiago Silva had already been capped for the Brazilian Youth team in the 1999 FIFA World Youth Championship, so FIFA cancelled the request for a change of nationality.

Although FIFA loosened the nationality transfer of uncapped players and players with multi-nationality in 2009, it has not benefited Tiago Silva, because he did not hold multi-nationality when he represented Brazil. He is still eligible to play for Brazil.

References

External links

Guardian Football

1979 births
Living people
Sportspeople from Rio Grande do Sul
Bulgarian footballers
Bulgaria international footballers
Brazilian footballers
Brazil under-20 international footballers
Brazilian emigrants to Bulgaria
Brazilian expatriate footballers
Bulgarian expatriate footballers
Esporte Clube Juventude players
Sociedade Esportiva Palmeiras players
PFC Litex Lovech players
PFC CSKA Sofia players
K.R.C. Genk players
Naturalised citizens of Bulgaria
Expatriate footballers in Bulgaria
Expatriate footballers in Belgium
First Professional Football League (Bulgaria) players
Belgian Pro League players
Association football defenders